Wellington Drive Technologies Ltd (WDT) is a New Zealand based company that supplies electricity-saving, electronically commutated (EC) motors and fans worldwide. Their focus is on advanced motors, electronics and software that save power.

The company makes motors from industrial plastics, rather than from stamped metal parts. They claim that this provides advantages in costs, performance and reliability. The company's products are suitable for ventilation, heat recovery, refrigeration and air conditioning.

The company was established in 1986 as a patent holding and licensing organization. In 1998 the company was restructured substantially and since then its engineering and commercial activities have been focused providing for the domestic and light industrial appliance market.

WDT maintains a multi-disciplinary research and engineering team in its 1850 m² corporate headquarters in Auckland, New Zealand.

The company is currently listed on the New Zealand Stock Exchange (NZX)

References
 Wellington Drive Technologies website

Technology companies of New Zealand
Technology companies established in 1986
New Zealand companies established in 1986